Adiós problemas (English language: Goodbye problems) is a 1955 Argentine romantic drama film directed by Kurt Land and written by Abel Santacruz. The film starred Enrique Muiño and Amalia Sánchez Ariño.

Synopsis
Centering on themes of morality, passion, lust and jealousy this romantic drama is the story of a righteous man who disgraces his family and his reputation when he is seduced by a pretty young woman.

Other cast
 Alberto Berco
 Miguel Dante
 Hilda Rey
 Osvaldo Terranova
 Miguel Angel Valera

Release
The film premiered on 18 May 1955.

External links
 
 http://www.cinenacional.com/peliculas/index.php?pelicula=28

1955 films
1950s Spanish-language films
Argentine black-and-white films
1955 romantic drama films
Films directed by Kurt Land
Argentine romantic drama films
1950s Argentine films